Look What You Made Me is the debut studio album by American rapper Yung Berg. It was released on August 12, 2008, via Koch Records. Production was handled by Rob Holladay, Jason 'JFK' Fleming, Boogz, Detail, Mr. Collipark and Xcel. It features guest appearances from Casha Darjean, Amerie, K. Young, Lloyd, Ray J, Trey Songz and Twista among others. The album debuted at #20 on the US Billboard 200 albums chart selling 19,000 copies in its first week.

Singles
The first single from the album was "Sexy Lady" featuring Junior; peaking at #18 on the Billboard Hot 100 it was included on the prequel EP, Almost Famous (subtitled The Sexy Lady EP). Despite the single being released over sixteen months before the album, Berg confirmed in an interview with fellow Chicago native and radio personality DJ Z that it would still be included on the album.

 The single "Sexy Can I" was included in the album even though it also is the first single from Ray J's fourth studio album All I Feel (released April 8, 2008), it peaked at #3 on the Hot 100, was certified 2× Platinum by the RIAA, and is the most successful single for both Ray J and Yung Berg to date.

Soon afterwards, Berg released a promotional street single, entitled "Do That There", produced by fellow Chicagoan Xcel (known for producing Shawnna's "Gettin' Some"), it featured a sample from Dude 'n Nem's single "Watch My Feet" and had them credited as featured artists. It is Yung Berg's least successful single to date, only peaking at #125 on the Hot R&B/Hip-Hop Songs chart.

The second official single came on May 13, 2008, with the release of "The Business". Assisted by his first Yung Boss Music Group signee and former Candy Hill lead singer Casha, it has entered the Hot 100, charting at #33 so far.

Track listing

Charts

References

External links

E1 Music albums
Hitmaka albums
2008 debut albums
Epic Records albums
Albums produced by Mr. Collipark
Albums produced by Detail (record producer)